Japana (Georgian: ჯაპანა (IPA: dʒɑpʼɑnɑ)) is a village in Lanchkhuti Municipality, which is in the Nigoti community. It is located in North Guria, 50 m above sea level and 7.45 miles (12 km) away from Lanchkhuti. In the village, there is a railway station on the Samtredia-Makhinjauri line and the road of international importance passes. Abasha, a path of domestic importance, also passes. Georgia Highway 12 passes through the village. There are three lakes in the village: Japana Lake, Didi Narional and Small Orange.

Architecture

Medieval fortress 
The monument of Georgian architecture - the medieval fortress, is preserved in the village. The fortress is located on a rocky hill. Near the fortress is a large village with the remains of 3 churches, one of which is called "Little Booth".

Citadel 
The highest place is a citadel surrounded by a wall with towers. The walls are constructed with bricks and mortar.

Population

Fishing 
During Soviet Times in 1934, a fish farm was arranged in the village with an area of 140 hectares (0.54 mi2). The floodwaters were taken from the Rioni and Kheviskali rivers. It produced 70 - 80 tons of fish.

See also 
 Georgian Soviet Encyclopedia

References 

Populated places in Lanchkhuti Municipality